Frimley Park in Frimley, Surrey, England, consists of Frimley Park mansion, a Grade II listed building, and the formal gardens, designed by Edward White in 1920. Since 1949 it has belonged to the War Office (now the Ministry of Defence), and currently hosts an Army Cadet training centre.

History
The estate of Frimley Manor was sold by Sir Henry Tichborne to James Lawrell the elder for £20,000 in 1789. In 1806 the estate was divided.

In the early 1860s most of the estate was parcelled up and sold off.

Theodore Alexander Ralli bought the estate in 1920, and commissioned Edward White ( 1873–1952) to lay out a formal rose garden and sunken garden. In 1947 (shortly after the end of World War II) more land was sold separately and the remaining  was purchased by the Officers' Association who two years later (in 1949) sold what remained of the estate to the current owners, the War Department (now the Ministry of Defence).

Notes

References

Further reading
 "Sales particulars", Frimley Park (1858) (quoted in Burgess) The Times (12 March 1859)
 Burgess, K. M., Frimley Park and Tekells Park Estates: A history of their gardens and grounds, (report for Surrey Gardens Trust, November 1999)
 Camberley News, 4 December 1909 (obituary John D Craig)
 Pevsner, N, Cherry, B, The Buildings of England: Surrey (rev edn 1971), p 248
 Victoria History of the County of Surrey 3, (1911), p 340
 Wellard, G., The History of Frimley Park Manor House (1995)

Grade II listed houses
Grade II listed buildings in Surrey